Leonard William Gotshalk (born October 21, 1949) is a former American football offensive tackle in the National Football League who played for the Atlanta Falcons. He played college football at Humboldt State University. He received third-team honors on the 1970 Little All-America college football team.

References

1949 births
Living people
American football offensive linemen
Atlanta Falcons players
Humboldt State Lumberjacks football players